460 Scania (prov. designation:  or ) is a background asteroid and a slow rotator from the central regions of the asteroid belt. It was discovered by German astronomer Max Wolf at the Heidelberg-Königstuhl State Observatory on 22 October 1900. It was named after the Swedish region of Scania, where a meeting was held by the Astronomische Gesellschaft in 1904.

Orbit and classification 

Scania is a non-family asteroid from the main belt's background population. It orbits the Sun in the central asteroid belt at a distance of 2.4–3.0 AU once every 4 years and 6 months (1,637 days; semi-major axis of 2.72 AU). Its orbit has an eccentricity of 0.11 and an inclination of 5° with respect to the ecliptic. The body's observation arc begins at Vienna Observatory on 25 October 1900, three nights after its official discovery observation at Heidelberg.

Naming 

This minor planet was named after the Swedish region of Scania or Skåne by its Latin name, on the occasion of a meeting held in Lund by the Astronomische Gesellschaft in 1904. The  was also mentioned in The Names of the Minor Planets by Paul Herget in 1955.

Physical characteristics 

In the Bus–Binzel SMASS classification, Scania is an uncommon K-type asteroid.

Rotation period 

In December 2017, a rotational lightcurve of Scania was obtained from photometric observations by Frederick Pilcher. Lightcurve analysis gave a well defined rotation period of  hours with a brightness variation of  magnitude. The results supersedes previous observations.

Diameter and albedo 

According to the surveys carried out by the Infrared Astronomical Satellite IRAS, the Japanese Akari satellite and the NEOWISE mission of NASA's Wide-field Infrared Survey Explorer, Scania measures between 19.689 and 23.58 kilometers in diameter and its surface has an albedo between 0.189 and 0.262. The Collaborative Asteroid Lightcurve Link derives an albedo of 0.1808 and a diameter of 21.63 kilometers based on an absolute magnitude of 10.8.

References

External links 
 Lightcurve Database Query (LCDB), at www.minorplanet.info
 Dictionary of Minor Planet Names, Google books
 Asteroids and comets rotation curves, CdR – Geneva Observatory, Raoul Behrend
 Discovery Circumstances: Numbered Minor Planets (1)-(5000) – Minor Planet Center
 
 

000460
Discoveries by Max Wolf
Named minor planets
460 Scania
000460
19001022